Proeulia sublentescens is a species of moth of the family Tortricidae. It is found in Chile in Araucanía Region and Malleco Province.

The wingspan is 19.5 mm. The ground colour of the forewings is ferruginous cream, but paler in the dorsal part, strigulated (finely streaked) with rust. The distal half of the wing is suffused with brownish ferruginous. The markings are brownish ferruginous. The hindwings are whitish and greyish. The ground colour of the forewings of the females is cream ferruginous with darker markings.

Etymology
The species name refers to the close relationship to Proeulia lentescens and is derived from Latin sub (meaning under).

References

Moths described in 2010
Proeulia
Moths of South America
Taxa named by Józef Razowski
Endemic fauna of Chile